Lee Saltz (born September 25, 1963) is a former professional American football quarterback in the National Football League who played for the Detroit Lions and the New England Patriots. Saltz also played in the Canadian Football League, the World League of American Football, and the Arena Football League.

Early life
Saltz grew up in Randolph, New Jersey, a football town in the northern part of the state.  Ted Hart, director of the Randolph Bulldogs midget program, is credited for teaching Saltz the basics of throwing and gripping the ball. 

Saltz played at Randolph High School for football coach, John Bauer, Sr. In his senior year, Saltz threw for 1,253 yards and had 7 touchdowns.

College career
Saltz earned a full ride to the Temple Owls football team, where he majored in Business Law and played for the head coach Bruce Arians.  In his freshman year (1983), Saltz debuted unexpectedly against Penn State when the injured starter, Tim Riordan, left early in the first half.  He finished that game with ten passes for 165 yards and two touchdowns.  Saltz never saw the bench again.

Saltz held numerous records at Temple, including a 95-yard touchdown pass which still stands today.  Lee finished eight in the 1986 National Quarterback rankings at Temple.

Professional career
After a standout career at Temple, Saltz was signed by the Detroit Lions in 1987 as an undrafted free agent.  Released mid-season in 1988 by Detroit, he was picked up by the Canadian Football League's Winnipeg Blue Bombers.  He played in the eastern division playoff game beating the Toronto Argonauts and ultimately winning a Grey Cup ring.  In 1989, he replaced Sean Salisbury as the Blue Bombers starting quarterback.
For a short period of time Lee was head lot attendant at Ed Bozarth Chevrolet.
In 1990, he was traded to the Saskatchewan Roughriders.  In 1991, Saltz left the Canadian Football league for the World League of American Football, where he played for the San Antonio Riders.  He wore the first ever football helmet camera on the playing field.  In 1992, Saltz returned to the NFL to play for the New England Patriots.  In 1993, Saltz played for the Hamilton Tiger-Cats, and in 1995, he played in the Arena Football League for the St. Louis Stampede.

References

1963 births
Living people
American football quarterbacks
American players of Canadian football
Canadian football quarterbacks
New England Patriots players
Players of American football from New Jersey
People from Randolph, New Jersey
Randolph High School (New Jersey) alumni
Sacramento Surge players
San Antonio Riders players
Sportspeople from Morris County, New Jersey
St. Louis Stampede players
Temple Owls football players
Winnipeg Blue Bombers players